The football (soccer) Campeonato Brasileiro Série B 2002, the second level of Brazilian National League, was played from August 11 to December 7, 2002. The competition had 26 clubs and two of them were promoted to Série A and six were relegated to Série C.The competition was won by Criciúma.

Criciúma defeated Fortaleza in the finals, and was declared 2002 Brazilian Série B champions, claiming the promotion to the 2003 Série A along with Fortaleza, the runners-up. The six worst ranked teams in the first round ( Americano, Botafogo-SP, Sampaio Corrêa, Guarany de Sobral, XV de Piracicaba and Bragantino) were relegated to play Série C in 2003.

Format
The 26 teams played against each other once. The eight best placed teams qualified to the quarter-finals, in which the eight-placed team played against the first-placed team, the seventh-placed team played against the second-placed team, the sixth-placed team played against the third-placed team, and the fifth-placed team played against the fourth-placed team. The quarter-finals, semi-finals and finals were played over two legs. The six worst teams in the first stage were relegated to the Campeonato Brasileiro Série C of the following year.

Teams

First stage

Quarterfinals

|}

Semifinals

|}

Finals

|}

Sources

References 

2002 in Brazilian football leagues
Campeonato Brasileiro Série B seasons